Tsvetan Zarev (born 5 November 1983) is a Bulgarian footballer currently playing for Bdin Vidin as a defender.

References

1983 births
Living people
Bulgarian footballers
PFC Spartak Varna players
OFC Vihren Sandanski players
Persiba Balikpapan players
PFC Lokomotiv Mezdra players
First Professional Football League (Bulgaria) players
Liga 1 (Indonesia) players
Expatriate footballers in Indonesia
Association football defenders